Saint-Quentin Island lies at the confluence of the Saint-Maurice River and Saint Lawrence River in the city of Trois-Rivières, Quebec, Canada. It is with islands "Saint-Christophe and "De La Poterie", the origin of the name of the city, in reference to the three channel that the Saint-Maurice River forms at its mouth with the St. Lawrence River flowing between two islands.

It owes its name to the judge said Quentin Moral, said Saint-Quentin, fur trader and one of the first dealers on this island. She is now a center of popular outdoor activities and relaxation at the hearth of city. The patron saint of the island is Quentin de Rome.

History 
It was first inhabited by an Algonquin tribe that there was corn (Indian corn in Quebec slang). Thereafter, the October 7, 1535, Jacques Cartier planted a cross on the island proclaiming sovereignty of French on this territory. It was not until nearly a hundred years, so that the father Paul Le Jeune (Jesuit) will notice the ruins of a fence and some Native American acres cleared when Indians grew corn.

Thus June 2, 1647, Governor Charles Jacques Huault de Montmagny allowed to François Marguerie, Jean Veron de Grandmesnil and Claude David to clear the island. The island then called Grandmesnil island and was thus designated as "terre à roture" (earth commoners). But Véron de Grandmesnil died shortly after and the island was renamed "Île de la Trinité" (Trinidad Island) for a time. Early 1660s, François Marguerie having bequeathed his estate to his sister Marie (widow of Jacques Hertel first marriage and wife of Quentin Morale said Saint-Quentin) in 1652, the island was finally renamed "Île Saint-Quentin". The natural environment of the island Saint-Quentin remained virtually unchanged; it remained virtually unused from eighteenth century until the end of the nineteenth century.

From the 1930, the recreational aspect of the island became important. The island belonged at the time to Quebec Savings and Trust Company Limited and the Canada Power and Paper Corporation was the subject of a bid from the City in 1933, but it was not until November 3, 1947, that the land is owned by the city. Meanwhile, she served as training camp for the Royal Canadian Navy. Services were gradually introduced in 1950.

The park and the beach on the island Saint-Quentin were officially inaugurated on June 24, 1962, in the presence of 5,000 people, when there were over 100,000 visitors. Since then, the island has been several facilities, including a marina, a bike path, an interpretative trail, an ice and camping. Several business and festivals are held annually on the island.

Island was renamed 

 Île Saint-Quentin, in reference of Judge Quentin Moral
 Île aux Cochons (Pigs Island)
 Île de Grandmesnil, in reference of Jean Véron Grandmesnil
 Île de la Trinité (Trinidad Island)
 Île Maillet
 Île Martel
 Îles George Baptist

Festivals and Events 

 Symposium of painting
 Movies of the Island (Outdoor movie projection, at dusk)
 Beach Party "La Plage" (The Beach)
 La Playa "Beach Club"
 Family Festival of Saint-Quentin Island
 International Canoe Classic Mauricie (Arrival)
 The Festival of Colors

See also 

 Trois-Rivières
 Saint-Maurice River
 St. Lawrence River
 List of islands of Quebec

References 

River islands of Quebec
Islands of the Saint Lawrence River
Trois-Rivières
Landforms of Mauricie